Radio is a 2013 Malayalam–language drama film directed by Umer Mohammed and starring Iniya, Sarayu, Nishan and Sreejith Vijay in pivotal roles. The film was produced by S. C. Pillai whose previous production Passenger was a critical and commercial success.

Plot
"Tune in for a change" is the tagline attached to Radio in the credits. The storyline is about a girl Priya who comes to the city for a job as a salesgirl in a jewellery shop, with a load of debt to pay off, played by Sarayu. She is new to the ways and customs of the city life. Her co-worker, Iniya (character name Shweta), gives her accommodation, since she has no place or relative's house to stay in the city. Shweta goes out every night, where Nishan (character name Manu), comes to pick her up. The entire storyline is clear, Shweta, a five star prostitute and associate Manu as pimp, for securing her business. It is a shock to Priya when she realizes the truth about Shweta and decides to leave her friendship and apartment.

A set back comes to Priya because of her need of cash, for her mother’s operation, which Shweta supports by her extra -profession. Since Priya’s requirement is cash, she too falls for the lucrative offers, to trade her body, if she wants to, for a psychiatrist doctor to provide him company for 1 or 2 years.

Meanwhile, Shweta's family decides to go ahead with a marriage proposal for her. She tries to avoid engagement. But the bridegroom is determined to take her in, and forget her past. She agrees for marriage, and they marries. One of her clients happens to be her husband’s friend, and his visits their house, adding up slight sparks of fire.

Priya follows her pro-life with the doctor and finally ends up cheated by her family and the doctor when his wife and daughter who abandoned him, returns from States. At last Priya becomes mad.

Maniyan Pilla Raju’s character as Priya’s father and Harisree Ashokan as a broker agent are similar set of masks which they have worn before.

Cast
 Iniya  as Swetha
 Sarayu Mohan as Priya
 Nishan as Manu
 Thalaivasal Vijay as Doctor
 Jayakrishnan as Jayan
 Maniyanpilla Raju as Priya's father
 Kochu Preman as Zakhir Hussain
 Harishree Ashokan as Jhonson
Narayanankutty as S.I.
 Irshad as Pradeesh Nair
 Shobha Mohan as Jayan's Mother
 Thesni Khan Dhamayanthi
 Nihal as Ravi
 Kalabhavan rahman as Radio Meman
 Ambika Mohan as Swetha's mother

Reception
The film received moderate to good reviews especially the first half of the movie is praised.

References

2013 films
2010s Malayalam-language films
2013 drama films
Indian drama films